Sir Stanley William Wells,  (born 21 May 1930) is an English Shakespearean scholar, writer, professor and editor who has been honorary president of the Shakespeare Birthplace Trust, professor emeritus at Birmingham University, and author of many books about Shakespeare, including Shakespeare Sex and Love, and is general editor of the Oxford Shakespeare and New Penguin Shakespeare series. He lives in Stratford-upon-Avon and was educated in English at University College, London (UCL).

Biography
Wells was born in Hull, the son of Stanley Cecil Wells MBE and Doris Wells. His father was a bus company traffic manager. Wells was educated at the Kingston High School grammar school in Hull. Wells took a degree in English at University College, London. He was invalided out of national service for the RAF in 1951. He became a Hampshire school teacher before moving to Stratford to complete his PhD. He was awarded his PhD in English by Birmingham University in 1961.

He was Professor of Shakespeare Studies and director of the Shakespeare Institute (University of Birmingham) 1988–1997, and is now emeritus professor of Shakespeare Studies.

Wells is co-editor (with Gary Taylor, John Jowett and William Montgomery) of the Oxford Complete Works and (with Michael Dobson) the Oxford Companion to Shakespeare, and has been general editor of the Oxford Shakespeare series since 1978. He edited several volumes for the New Penguin Shakespeare series.

In 2009, Wells revealed the existence of the Cobbe portrait. He stated his belief, based on three years of research, that the portrait is a true portrait of Shakespeare, painted from life.

On 20 October 2009, Wells appeared on BBC 4's comedy panel show It's Only a Theory – defending the prevailing opinion within contemporary Shakespeare studies that "The plays of William Shakespeare were written by William Shakespeare of Stratford-Upon-Avon" and debunking the theory that Shakespeare's plays were written by some of his contemporaries.

In June 2010, Wells was awarded the Sam Wanamaker Award by Shakespeare's Globe, an award given annually in the name of the Globe's founder Sam Wanamaker to celebrate work which has increased the understanding and enjoyment of Shakespeare.

In 2013, together with Rev. Dr. Paul Edmondson, he called upon the Dean and Chapter of Westminster Abbey to remove the question mark which appears in place of a date of death in the memorial window to Christopher Marlowe in Poets' Corner in Westminster Abbey.

Personal life
Wells is married to novelist Susan Hill, and the couple was once considered part of the "Gloucestershire mafia" set of well-connected writers and socialites. They separated around 2011. He is the father of author Jessica Ruston and of Clemency Wells. Imogen, Hill and Wells' second-born child, died in infancy.

Honours
Wells was appointed a Commander of the Order of the British Empire (CBE) in the 2007 Birthday Honours for services to literature. He was knighted in the 2016 Birthday Honours for services to scholarship.

Wells was awarded an honorary DLitt by the University of Warwick in 2008.

In 2016, he was awarded the President's Medal by the British Academy "for his lifetime service to the study, knowledge and enjoyment of William Shakespeare".

Commonwealth honours
 Commonwealth honours

Scholastic

Honorary degrees

Awards

Major publications
Re-Editing Shakespeare for the Modern Reader (1984)
The Oxford Dictionary of Shakespeare (1998)
Shakespeare in the Theatre: An Anthology of Criticism (2000)
Shakespeare: The Poet and his Plays (2001)
The Oxford Shakespeare: King Lear (2001)
Shakespeare For All Time (2002)
Shakespeare & Co. (2006)
Shakespeare, Sex, and Love (2010)
Shakespeare Beyond Doubt (editor with Paul Edmondson, 2013)
Great Shakespearean Actors (2015)
The Shakespeare Circle (editor, 2016)

References

1930 births
Living people
Academics of the University of Birmingham
Alumni of the University of Birmingham
Alumni of University College London
Commanders of the Order of the British Empire
Fellows of the Royal Society of Literature
Knights Bachelor
Recipients of the President's Medal (British Academy)
Shakespearean scholars
Writers from Kingston upon Hull